Juan B. Galaviz Charter School (JBG) was a state charter school located in Houston, Texas. The charter high school was an affiliate of the National Council of La Raza. Previously the school was located in the Northside district of Houston.

History

Galaviz Charter School was one program of Galaviz Academy, an educational organization established in 1993. The organization's programs include vocational training, ESL instruction, and an education support and advocacy program for adjudicated youth 10–16 years of age. In 2012 it had 70 students; they were categorized as at-risk.

In 2012 Nency Garcia pleaded guilty to embezzling $40,000 ($ according to inflation) from Galaviz.

The school was scheduled to hold another school year starting in fall 2013, but it closed shortly before the beginning of the school year since it was in financial trouble. It owed $27,000 ($ according to inflation) in payroll taxes to the Internal Revenue Service (IRS) as of March 2013. The Texas Education Agency (TEA) revoked accreditation due to the loss of the tax-exempt status, with notification that it would do so dated July 19, 2013.

School uniform
Students are required to wear school uniforms.

See also

 List of state-operated charter schools in Houston

References

External links
 Juan B. Galaviz Charter School
July 2010 Texas Education Agency Data

Charter high schools in Houston
2013 disestablishments in Texas
Educational institutions disestablished in 2013